Pichard is a French surname. Notable people with the surname include:

Françoise Pichard (born 1941), French cartoonist and illustrator
Georges Pichard (1920–2003), French comics artist
Raymond Pichard French Priest and television presenter
William Pichard (1897–1957), Swiss bobsledder

See also
Pichardo

French-language surnames